Qallunaat Island (old spelling: Qavdlunât) is an uninhabited island in Avannaata municipality in northwestern Greenland.

History 
Qallunaat Island was briefly inhabited between 1898, when the Sarfaq settlement was founded, and 1919, when it was abandoned. Sarfaq was perched on the low-lying northern end of the island, at the shores of Kangerlussuaq Icefjord.

Geography 
Qallunaat Island is located in Tasiusaq Bay, in the north-central part of Upernavik Archipelago. It is separated from Tuttorqortooq Island by the Qaqqakassaup Ikerasaa strait in the north, from the mainland of Greenland by the Kangerlussuaq Icefjord in the northeast, and by channels of Tasiusaq Bay from Nuuluk Island in the east, Nutaarmiut Island in the south, and Mattaangassut Island in the west.

The island is hilly in its southern part, falling to the sea with red, silver, and light-colored cliffs. At , Inngik is the highest mountain on the island, located in the western part of the island.

Coastline 
The coastline of the island is developed, with many inlets indenting the coastline, particularly in its northern part.

Promontories

References 

Uninhabited islands of Greenland
Tasiusaq Bay
Islands of the Upernavik Archipelago